Brendan Hamill (born 1945, Belfast, Northern Ireland) is a poet and writer.

Biography
Hamill was born and grew up in the Falls Road area of Belfast. His home was on the Whiterock Road opposite Belfast City Cemetery. He attended St. Kevin's Primary School and then St. Thomas's Secondary School near Ballymurphy. At the latter school the headteacher was the writer Michael McLaverty. Many years later Hamill recalled his teaching: "Over and over again he explained the precise word, the need for feeling in the poetry. There would be no Sons And Lovers without feeling – the reading public would know it was fraudulent. The preachments were gentle but firm, reasonableness in all things." Another one of his teachers at the school was Seamus Heaney.

After finishing school, he worked for several years in England. He recalled: "A lot of my time was spent between the bookshops at Tottenham Court Road and Charing Cross at lunchtimes."

He then returned to Northern Ireland to study for a degree in English at the New University of Ulster. One of his lecturers was the critic Walter Allen. His fellow students included the poet Gerald Dawe and the writer Brian Keenan. After he graduated he subsequently worked for several years as a teacher in Kilcullen, County Kildare and later in Belfast.

Work
He has published two poetry chapbooks - the first Emigrant Brother and the second Alameda Park.

His poetry has been published in a wide range of newspapers and magazines including Phoenix, Belfast Telegraph, Irish Times and the Irish Press, included in anthologies and read on both the BBC and RTÉ.

His critical work has been published in various magazines including Fortnight.

He was very enthusiastic about promoting the work of the poet Padraic Fiacc. He read at the Belfast literary festival celebrating poet Padraic Fiacc.

He spoke at the launch of ‘The Literature of the Troubles Project’.

Works

Poetry
 Emigrant Brother, Lagan Press, Belfast, 1976
 Alameda Park, Glandore, Belfast, 2000 
 Letter to America: poems on the 30 year war in N. Ireland, Glandore, 1998

Criticism
 "Brendan Hamill on Fiacc", Krino (Summer 1995).

Anthologies

References

Journalists from Belfast
20th-century poets from Northern Ireland
Schoolteachers from Northern Ireland
Alumni of Ulster University
Writers from Belfast
1945 births
Living people
Male writers from Northern Ireland
Male poets from Northern Ireland
20th-century British male writers
20th-century British writers

it:Brendan Hamill